Shizhenia is a genus of flowering plants in the family Orchidaceae. Its only species is Shizhenia pinguicula, native to south-east China (north-east Zhejiang).

Description
Shizhenia grows from a ovoid shaped tuber. It has a single stem leaf, situated near the base of the stem. The inflorescence consists of a single relatively large flower, rose-red to purple in colour, with a three-lobed lip (labellum). The upper sepal and the lateral petals are grouped to form a hood. The flower has a conical spur, longer than the lip. There are two stigmas that extend under the short rostellum.

Taxonomy
The species was first described in 1878 as Gymnadenia pinguicula. It was later transferred again to Habenaria and then Amitostigma. A molecular phylogenetic study in 2014, found that species of Amitostigma, Neottianthe and Ponerorchis were mixed together in a single clade, making none of the three genera monophyletic as then circumscribed. Amitostigma and Neottianthe were subsumed into Ponerorchis, with Amitostigma pinguicula becoming Ponerorchis pinguicula. Later studies suggested that Ponerorchis pinguicula lay outside the main clade consisting of Hemipilia, Ponerorchis, Sirindhornia, and Tsaiorchis, and a new genus, Shizhenia, was created for it. After some adjustment of the generic boundaries, the five genera were related as shown in the following cladogram. All are placed in subtribe Orchidinae, tribe Orchideae, subfamily Orchidoideae.

References

Orchideae
Flora of Southeast China
Monotypic Orchidoideae genera
Orchideae genera